Aristagoras usually refers to the tyrant of Miletus (d.496BC) who began the Ionian Revolt.

Aristagoras was also a Greek masculine given name which may refer to:

 Aristagoras, 6th century BC, father of Hegesistratus, the emissary from Samos to the Lacedaemonian army at Delos in one incident of the Persian Wars
 Aristagoras of Cyme (6th century BC), tyrant of Cyme, son of Heracleides
 Aristagoras, 5th century BC, tyrant of Cyzicus on the Propontis
 Aristagoras (poet), 5th century BC, a comic writer at Miletus
 Aristagoras of Tenedos, c. 446 BC, a person of athletic note mentioned in an ode of Pindar
 Aristagoras, 4th century BC, son of Eudoxus of Cnidus
 Aristagoras (writer), Greek historian on Egypt
 Aristagoras, c. 268 BC, member of the Amphictyonic League at Delphi for that year for the Ionians

Its feminine form Aristagora may refer to:

 Aristagora, 6th century BC, mistress of the orator Hyperides

See also